Newspaper Row may refer to:
Newspaper Row (Boston)
Newspaper Row (Minneapolis)
Newspaper Row (New York City)
Newspaper Row (San Francisco)
Newspaper Row (Washington, D.C.)

Newspaper row